Super Fighter Team is a video game production and publishing company whose primary focus is on producing and publishing new video games for classic systems such as the Sega Genesis and Atari Lynx, among others. The company was founded in 2004 by salesman and entrepreneur Brandon Cobb and is based in San Diego, California.

Super Fighter Team takes their name from a little-known brawler from the early 1990s, C&E Inc.'s Super Fighter, which was the first title acquired by the company. The company has since acquired the rights to produce and publish various other titles that were well-known in other regions, but relatively unknown to the Western world.

Games Published

References

External links 
 Official website
 Super Fighter Team at MobyGames
 Article covering the company's history at IGN.com

Video game companies of the United States
Homebrew software